Lowie van Zundert (born 23 September 1998) is a Dutch professional footballer who plays for De Treffers, as a striker. He was born in Nijmegen.

Career
Lowie van Zundert started playing football with VV Ravenstein and then joined RKSV Margriet, where he played for the 2008/09 season. In 2009 he joined NEC and from 2016, he was registered at the Voetbal Academie N.E.C./FC Oss, where he scored no fewer than 41 times on behalf of the A2 team in the 2016/2017 season and gave 19 assists. Because of these achievements, the striker was given a chance at the first team of Nijmegen during the preparation for the 2017/2018 season and made his debut in a friendly match against Al Jazira Club.

References

1998 births
Living people
Dutch footballers
NEC Nijmegen players
RKC Waalwijk players
De Treffers players
Eerste Divisie players
Tweede Divisie players
Association football forwards
Footballers from Nijmegen